Mabee's Corners is a community in Norfolk County, in Southwestern Ontario, Canada.

References

Communities in Norfolk County, Ontario